Sir Arthur James Irvine, QC PC (14 July 1909 – 15 December 1978) was a British barrister and politician. He was the Labour MP for Liverpool Edge Hill from the 1947 by-election until he died aged 69.

Irvine was educated at Edinburgh Academy and Oriel College, Oxford, where he was president of the Oxford Union in the Hilary Term 1932. He became a barrister in 1935, when he was called by Middle Temple, and became secretary to the Lord Chief Justice 1935–40. He became Queen's Counsel in 1958  and recorder of Colchester in 1965. In 1937, Irvine stood as a Liberal candidate at Bethnal Green North East in the London County Council elections.

In his first two unsuccessful parliamentary contests in Kincardine and Western Aberdeenshire in 1935 and 1939, Irvine was a Liberal Party candidate, but later joined the Labour Party. After two further election defeats in Twickenham in 1945 and Aberdeen South in 1946, he was eventually elected Member of Parliament (MP) for Liverpool Edge Hill at the 1947 by-election. He was deselected by his local party in 1977.

Irvine became Solicitor General for England and Wales in 1967, when he was knighted and served till 1970. 
He became a privy councillor in the New Years Honours 1970.

His son Michael Irvine served as Conservative MP for Ipswich between 1987 and 1992.

References

|-

1909 births
1978 deaths
20th-century British lawyers
Alumni of Oriel College, Oxford
British barristers
Labour Party (UK) MPs for English constituencies
Liberal Party (UK) parliamentary candidates
Members of the Privy Council of the United Kingdom
Ministers in the Wilson governments, 1964–1970
People educated at Edinburgh Academy
Presidents of the Oxford Union
Solicitors General for England and Wales
UK MPs 1945–1950
UK MPs 1950–1951
UK MPs 1955–1959
UK MPs 1959–1964
UK MPs 1964–1966
UK MPs 1966–1970
UK MPs 1970–1974
UK MPs 1974
UK MPs 1974–1979